.17 Bumble Bee is a  Wildcat cartridge designed for varmint hunting sometime in the mid-20th century. The cartridges' bullet is 4 mm in diameter, and it has been criticized for its low velocities, and ineffective use in killing varmints.

References

Wildcat cartridges
Ammunition
Pistol and rifle cartridges